Hadrosauroidea is a clade or superfamily of ornithischian dinosaurs that includes the "duck-billed" dinosaurs, or hadrosaurids, and all dinosaurs more closely related to them than to Iguanodon. Their remains have been recovered in Asia, Europe, Africa and the Americas. Many primitive hadrosauroids, such as the Asian Probactrosaurus and Altirhinus, have traditionally been included in a paraphyletic (unnatural grouping) "Iguanodontidae". With cladistic analysis, the traditional Iguanodontidae has been largely disbanded, and probably includes only Iguanodon and perhaps its closest relatives.

Classification
The cladogram below follows an analysis by Andrew McDonald, 2012, and shows the position of Hadrosauroidea within Styracosterna.

The cladogram below follows an analysis by Wu Wenhao and Pascal Godefroit (2012).

Cladogram after Prieto-Marquez and Norell (2010).

A phylogenetic analysis performed by Ramírez-Velasco et al. (2012) found a large polytomy between all hadrosauroids that are more derived than Probactrosaurus but less derived than Hadrosauridae. The exclusion of Claosaurus, Jeyawati, Levnesovia, Nanyangosaurus, Shuangmiaosaurus and Telmatosaurus from the analysis resulted in a more resolved topology.

See also

 Timeline of hadrosaur research

References

 
Early Cretaceous first appearances
Maastrichtian extinctions